Mike McConnell (born July 26, 1943) is a former vice admiral in the United States Navy. During his naval career he served as Director of the National Security Agency from 1992 to 1996. His civilian career includes serving as the United States Director of National Intelligence from 20 February 2007 to 27 January 2009 during the Bush administration and also seven days of the Obama administration. He is currently Vice Chairman at Booz Allen Hamilton.

Early life, education, and family
McConnell was born and grew up in Greenville, South Carolina. 
 He graduated from Wade Hampton High School (Greenville, South Carolina) in 1964, and first attended college at North Greenville Junior College, later earning a Bachelor of Arts in Economics from Furman University. He holds a Master of Public Administration from George Washington University, and is a graduate of the National Defense University and the National Defense Intelligence College (Strategic Intelligence). He is married to Terry McConnell, and together they have four children and nine grandchildren.

Military and intelligence career

McConnell received his commission in the United States Navy in 1967. He worked as the Intelligence Officer (J2) for the Chairman of the Joint Chiefs of Staff and the United States Secretary of Defense during Operation Desert Shield/Storm and the dissolution of the Soviet Union. He developed approaches for improving information flow among intelligence agencies and combat forces in the Gulf War.

From 1992 to 1996, McConnell served as Director of the National Security Agency (NSA). He led NSA as it adapted to the multi-polar threats brought about by the end of the Cold War. Under his leadership, NSA routinely provided global intelligence and information security services to the White House, Cabinet officials, the United States Congress, and a broad array of military and civilian intelligence customers. He also served as a member of the Director of Central Intelligence senior leadership team to address major intelligence programmatic and substantive issues from 1992 until 1996.

In 1996, McConnell retired from the Navy as a vice admiral after 29 years of service – 26 as a career Intelligence Officer. In addition to many of the nation's highest military awards for meritorious service, he holds the nation's highest award for service in the Intelligence Community. He also served as the Chairman of the Intelligence and National Security Alliance.

McConnell was the second person to hold the position of Director of National Intelligence. He was nominated by President George W. Bush on January 5, 2007, and was sworn in at Bolling Air Force Base in Washington, D.C. on February 20, 2007. McConnell's appointment to the post was initially greeted with broad bipartisan support, although he has since attracted criticism for advocating some of the Bush administration's more controversial policies.

Before his nomination as DNI, McConnell had served as a Senior Vice President with the consulting firm Booz Allen Hamilton, focusing on the Intelligence and National Security areas. From 2005 until his confirmation as DNI in 2007, he was also chairman of the board of the Intelligence and National Security Alliance, the "premier not-for-profit, nonpartisan, private sector professional organization providing a structure and interactive forum for thought leadership, the sharing of ideas, and networking within the intelligence and national security communities" whose members include leaders in industry, government, and academia.

On Tuesday, August 14, 2007, McConnell visited Texas with House Intelligence Committee chairman Silvestre Reyes to review border security, and granted a wide-ranging interview to the El Paso Times newspaper, which surprised many in the intelligence community for its candor on sensitive topics such as the recent changes in the Foreign Intelligence Surveillance Act and the NSA warrantless surveillance controversy.  At the end of the interview, McConnell cautioned reporter Chris Roberts that he should consider whether enemies of the U.S. could gain from the information he just shared, leaving it up to the paper to decide what to publish. The El Paso Times put the entire, unexpurgated interview on their website on August 22, with executive editor Dionicio Flores saying "I don't believe it damaged national security or endangered any of our people."

A resurgent Taliban is back in charge over parts of Afghanistan, McConnell told CNN on February 27, 2008, in an assessment that differed from the one made January 2008 by Defense Secretary Robert Gates.

On January 24, 2009, it was announced that McConnell would return to Booz Allen as a Senior Vice President.

Initiatives as DNI

100 Day Plan for Integration and Collaboration

Two months after taking office, McConnell created a series of initiatives designed to build the foundation for increased cooperation and reform of the U.S. Intelligence Community (IC). His plan, dubbed "100 Day Plan for Integration and Collaboration" focused on efforts to enable the IC to act as a unified enterprise in a collaborative manner. It focused on six enterprise integration priorities:
 Create a Culture of Collaboration
 Foster Collection and Analytic Transformation
 Build Acquisition Excellence and Technology Leadership
 Modernize Business Practices
 Accelerate Information Sharing
 Clarify and Align DNI's Authorities

Subsequently, a 500 Day Plan was designed to sustain the momentum with an expanded set of initiatives and a greater level of participation. It was set to deepen integration of the Community's people, processes, and technologies. The plan addressed a new performance management framework that entails six performance elements that all agencies must have.

500 Day Plan for Integration and Collaboration
The 100 Day Plan was meant to "jump start" a series of initiatives based on a deliberate planning process with specific deadlines and measures to ensure that needed reforms were implemented.  The 500 Day Plan, which started in August 2007, was designed to accelerate and sustain this momentum with an expanded set of initiatives and broader IC participation.  It contains 10 "core" initiatives which will be tracked by the senior leadership in the Intelligence Community, and 33 "enabling" initiatives.  The initiatives are based on the same six focus areas described in the 100 Day Plan.

The top initiatives are:

 Treat Diversity as a Strategic Mission Imperative
 Implement Civilian IC Joint Duty Program
 Enhance Information Sharing Policies, Processes, and Procedures
 Create Collaborative Environment for All Analysts
 Establish National Intelligence Coordination Center
 Implement Acquisition Improvement Plan
 Modernize the Security Clearance Process
 Align Strategy, Budget, and Capabilities through a Strategic Enterprise Management System
 Update Policy Documents Clarifying and Aligning IC Authorities

Director McConnell ended office near the 400th day of his 500-day plan.

Updating FISA
McConnell approached Congress in early August 2007 on the need to "modernize FISA," claiming two changes were needed (initial efforts began in April – see the factsheet for more). First, the Intelligence Community should not be required, because of technology changes since 1978, to obtain court orders to effectively collect foreign intelligence from "foreign targets" located overseas. He also argued that telecoms being sued for violating the nation's wiretapping laws must be protected from liability—regardless of the veracity of the charges. Shortly thereafter, McConnell took an active role  on Capitol Hill for legislation being drafted by Congress. On August 3, McConnell announced that he "strongly oppose[d]" the House's proposal because it wasn't strong enough. After heated debate, Congress updated FISA by passing the Protect America Act of 2007.

On September 10, 2007, testimony before the Senate Committee on Homeland Security and Governmental Affairs, McConnell asserted that the recently passed Protect America Act of 2007, which eased restrictions in FISA, had helped foil a major terror plot in Germany.  U.S. intelligence-community officials questioned the accuracy of McConnell's testimony and urged his office to correct it, which he did in a statement issued September 12, 2007. Critics cited the incident as an example of the Bush administration's exaggerated claims and contradictory statements about surveillance activities.  Counterterrorism officials familiar with the background of McConnell's testimony said they did not believe he made inaccurate statements intentionally as part of any strategy by the administration to persuade Congress to make the new eavesdropping law permanent. Those officials said they believed McConnell gave the wrong answer because he was overwhelmed with information and merely mixed up his facts.

In that same testimony, McConnell blamed the death of a kidnapped American soldier in Iraq on the requirements of FISA and the slowness of the courts. However, a timeline later released showed that the delays were mostly inside the NSA, casting doubt again on McConnell's truthfulness.

McConnell, speaking to a Congressional panel in defense of the Protect America Act, said that the Russian and Chinese foreign intelligence services are nearly as active as during the Cold War. In other September 18, 2007 testimony before the House Judiciary Committee, McConnell addressed the NSA warrantless surveillance controversy, saying that that agency had conducted no telephone surveillance of Americans without obtaining a warrant in advance since he became Director of National Intelligence in February, 2007. McConnell called FISA a "foundational law" with "important legacy of protecting the rights of Americans," which was passed in the era of Watergate and in the aftermath of the Church and Pike investigations. He stressed that changes should honor that legacy for privacy and against foreign threats.

Analytic Outreach
July 2008, Director McConnell issued a directive (ICD 205) for analysts to build relationships with outside experts on topics of concern to the intelligence community—a recommendation highlighted in the WMD Commission Report.

Updating Executive Order 12333
Director McConnell worked with the White House to overhaul Executive Order 12333, which outlines fundamental guidance to intelligence agencies. McConnell believes the update is necessary to incorporate the intelligence community's new organizations and new technologies and methods. The redo is expected to help the intelligence agencies work together, and to reflect the post 9/11 threat environment.

In July 2008, President Bush issued Executive Order 13470, which amended 12333.

Information Integration and Sharing
As one of McConnell's last acts as DNI, he signed ICD501 "Discovery and Dissemination or Retrieval of Information Within the Intelligence Community" to dramatically increase access to several databases held by various agencies in the community. The policy establishes rules to govern disputes when access is not granted, with the DNI as the final adjudicator to resolve disputes between organizations. He also established the Intelligence Information Integration Program (I2P) under the leadership of then-CIO Patrick Gorman and then NSA-CIO Dr. Prescott Winter.  The goal of I2P was to create a shared infrastructure and family of shared services as a means to increase information access, sharing and collaboration throughout the US Intelligence Community.

Integrated Planning, Programming and Budgeting System
McConnell led the effort to create an integrated planning, programming, and budgeting system to more fully integrate and optimize the capabilities of the Intelligence Community. Previously, each agency's budget was developed independently and aggregated for Congress. After the issuance of ICD106 Strategic Enterprise Management (IC SEM), the Intelligence Community budget was more closely aligned to strategic goals and objectives, requirements, and performance criteria. ICD 106 was replaced by ICD 116 in 2011.

Years after DNI
In early April 2010, Admiral McConnell called for expanding the powers of the DNI by giving him tenure and creating a Department of Intelligence for the DNI to oversee and fully control to settle the continued fighting amongst agencies within various departments.
On February 12, 2020, Admiral McConnell was named the executive director of Cyber Florida.  Cyber Florida is a state-funded organization hosted at USF that works with all 12 public universities in Florida, as well as private industry, government and the military to build partnerships and develop programs that grow and strengthen Florida's cybersecurity industry.

Career overview
 , Mekong Delta, 1967–1968
 Naval Investigative Service, Japan, 1968–1970
 Commander of Middle East Force Operations, 1971–1974
 Executive assistant to Director of Naval Intelligence, 1986–1987
 Chief of Naval Forces Division at National Security Agency, 1987–1988
 Director of Intelligence (N2) Commander in Chief Pacific Fleet, 1989–1990
 Intelligence director for Joint Chiefs of Staff, 1990–1992
 Director of NSA, 1992–1996
 Senior Vice President Booz Allen Hamilton, 1996–2006
Director of National Intelligence, 2007–2009
 Executive Vice President Booz Allen Hamilton, 2009–2012
 Advisory Board Member of the Council on CyberSecurity, 2013
 Executive Director, Cyber Florida. 2020–present.

References

External links

The Office of the Director of National Intelligence Official Website
The Spymaster: Can Mike McConnell fix America’s intelligence community? Lawrence Wright, The New Yorker, January 21, 2008
El Paso Times interview transcript El Paso Times, released August 22, 2007
Mike McConnell, Russ Feingold, David Brooks, Bob Woodward, Stephen Hayes Meet the Press, July 22, 2007, transcript of McConnell's first TV interview as Director of National Intelligence
McConnell talks about his views intelligence reform Foreign Affairs, July 1, 2007
A Law Terrorism Outran: We Need a FISA For the 21st Century Mike McConnell, Washington Post, May 21, 2007
John Negroponte and John McConnell Antiwar Radio: Larisa Alexandrovna , January 10, 2007
Security and Strategy in the Age of Discontinuity: A Management Framework for the Post-9/11 World, Ralph W. Shrader and Mike McConnell, Strategy+Business, First Quarter 2002

|-

1943 births
United States Navy personnel of the Gulf War
Booz Allen Hamilton people
Directors of the National Security Agency
Furman University alumni
Trachtenberg School of Public Policy & Public Administration alumni
Living people
National Defense University alumni
National Intelligence University alumni
People from Greenville, South Carolina
People of the Defense Intelligence Agency
United States Directors of National Intelligence
United States Navy vice admirals
Recipients of the National Intelligence Distinguished Service Medal
Center for a New American Security